Alexander Christian Frederick, Count of Württemberg (5 November 1801, Copenhagen – 7 July 1844, Wildbad) was a German army officer and poet. He was the eldest surviving son of William Frederick Philip, Duke of Württemberg, who was a younger brother of Frederick I of Württemberg

He received a military education in order to become a regular officer. Afterwards, he was commissioned as a lieutenant colonel in the 3rd Cavalry Regiment of Württemberg. The regiment was stationed in Esslingen am Neckar where Alexander von Württemberg stayed in the Obere Palmsche Palais.

For his summer residence, he lived in Schloss Serach. There he visited with poets such as Emma Niendorf, Gustav Schwab, Justinus Kerner, Ludwig Uhland, and Hermann Kurz. These visits came to be known as the Serach Poet Circle.

Alexander von Württemberg formed a particularly close friendship with Nikolaus Lenau, who shared his dejection and depression. He was married in 1832 to his Hungarian wife, Helene Festetics de Tolna. Together they had two sons and two daughters.

He suffered from chronic headaches and moved to Italy in 1843 in a futile attempt to improve his health. He then moved to Wildbad, Württemberg where he died from a stroke in 1844. His body is interred in the Stiftskirche, Stuttgart.

Ancestry

References 

1801 births
1844 deaths
People from Copenhagen
House of Württemberg
Military personnel of Württemberg
German poets
German male poets
19th-century German poets
19th-century German male writers
19th-century German writers